The KLIF Triangle Point Studios is a building located in Downtown Dallas, at 2120 Commerce St. It was the headquarters for KLIF/1190 AM, which is currently owned by Cumulus Media.  The building is in the shape of a triangle and has glass windows so that pedestrians and downtown shoppers could stop by the studio and see a live radio broadcast in progress.

Buildings and structures in Dallas